Dolna Oryahovitsa is a town in northern Bulgaria, part of Gorna Oryahovitsa municipality, Veliko Tarnovo Province.

Geography 
Dolna Oryahovitsa is situated on the coast of Yantra River, 10 kilometers South from Veliko Tarnovo, 3 kilometers north from Gorna Oryahovitsa, and 250 kilometers east from Bulgaria's capital Sofia. The climate in the area is warm during the summer, whereas the winters are cold.

History 
The name of Dolna Oryahovitsa is mentioned in Turkish documents in the end of XVII and XVIII centuries. The town takes place in an old Slavic settlement, which was famous for its fertile agricultural lands. Dolna Oryahovitsa becomes a town in 1985. During the Balkan wars, two men voluntarily participated in the Macedonian uprisings.

Population 

 According to Bulgaria's Population Census in 2011.

Numbers and percentage of ethnic groups according to the National 2011 Census.

References

Towns in Bulgaria
Populated places in Veliko Tarnovo Province